The CAVB qualification for the 2006 FIVB Volleyball Men's World Championship saw member nations compete for two places at the finals in Japan.

Draw
13 CAVB national teams entered qualification. The teams were distributed according to their position in the FIVB Senior Men's Rankings as of 15 January 2004 using the serpentine system for their distribution. (Rankings shown in brackets) Teams ranked 1–6 did not compete in the first round, and automatically qualified for the second round.

First round

Second round

First round

Pool A
Venue:  Hashim Daifalla Sports Hall, Khartoum, Sudan
Dates: February 1–3, 2005
All times are East Africa Time (UTC+03:00)

|}

|}

Pool B
Venue:  UKZN Sport Centre, Durban, South Africa
Dates: April 8–10, 2005
All times are South African Standard Time (UTC+02:00)

|}

|}

Second round

Pool C
Venue:  El Menzah Sports Palace, Tunis, Tunisia
Dates: July 28–30, 2005
All times are Central European Time (UTC+01:00)

|}

|}

Pool D
Venue:  Sport Union Club, Alexandria, Egypt
Dates: March 24–26, 2005
All times are Eastern European Time (UTC+02:00)

|}

|}

References

External links
 2006 World Championship Qualification

2006 FIVB Volleyball Men's World Championship
2005 in volleyball